Cowart is an unincorporated community located in Tallahatchie County, Mississippi.

The county's former sheriff Clarence Strider—a witness for the defense at the Emmett Till murder trial—narrowly missed being shot in the head while he sat in his car at a general store in Cowart in 1957.

References

Unincorporated communities in Tallahatchie County, Mississippi
Unincorporated communities in Mississippi